Massimo Paradiso (born 19 October 1968 in Vico Equense) is an Italian rower. He finished 4th in the quadruple sculls at the 1996 Summer Olympics.

References 
 
 

1968 births
Living people
Italian male rowers
Olympic rowers of Italy
Rowers at the 1996 Summer Olympics
Sportspeople from the Province of Naples
World Rowing Championships medalists for Italy